The 1986–87 NCAA Division I men's basketball season began in November 1986 and ended with the Final Four in New Orleans on March 30, 1987.

Major rule changes 
Beginning in 1986–87, the following rules changes were implemented:
 The three-point field goal was introduced and set at 19 feet, 9 inches from the center of the basket.
 A television replay could be used to prevent or rectify a scorer’s or timer’s mistake or a malfunction of the clock.

Season outlook

Pre-season polls 
The top 20 from the AP Poll during the pre-season.

Regular season

Conference winners and tournaments

Statistical leaders

Conference standings

Postseason tournaments

NCAA tournament

Final Four - Louisiana Superdome, New Orleans, Louisiana

National Invitation tournament

NIT Semifinals and Final

Award winners

Consensus All-American teams

Major player of the year awards 

 Wooden Award: David Robinson, Navy
 Naismith Award: David Robinson, Navy
 Associated Press Player of the Year: David Robinson, Navy
 UPI Player of the Year: David Robinson, Navy
 NABC Player of the Year: David Robinson, Navy
 Oscar Robertson Trophy (USBWA): David Robinson, Navy
 Adolph Rupp Trophy: David Robinson, Navy
 Sporting News Player of the Year: David Robinson, Navy

Major coach of the year awards 
 Associated Press Coach of the Year: Tom Davis, Iowa
 UPI Coach of the Year: John Thompson, Georgetown
 Henry Iba Award (USBWA): John Chaney, Temple
 NABC Coach of the Year: Rick Pitino, Providence
 Naismith College Coach of the Year: Bob Knight, Indiana
 CBS/Chevrolet Coach of the Year: Joey Meyer, DePaul
 Sporting News Coach of the Year: Rick Pitino, Providence

Other major awards 
 Frances Pomeroy Naismith Award (Best player under 6'0): Muggsy Bogues, Wake Forest
 Robert V. Geasey Trophy (Top player in Philadelphia Big 5): Nate Blackwell, Temple
 NIT/Haggerty Award (Top player in NYC): Mark Jackson, St. John's and Kevin Houston, Army

Coaching changes 

A number of teams changed coaches during the season and after it ended.

References